Des Allemands is an unincorporated community and census-designated place (CDP) in Lafourche and St. Charles parishes in the southeastern part of the U.S. state of Louisiana. The population was 2,179 at the 2020 census. The town, known as the "Catfish Capital of the Universe", is along the Bayou des Allemands, which is the boundary of Lafourche and St. Charles parishes. Lac des Allemands is located northwest of the town. The ZIP code for Des Allemands is 70030.

The St. Charles Parish portion of Des Allemands is part of the New Orleans metropolitan statistical area, while the Lafourche Parish portion is part of the Houma–Bayou Cane–Thibodaux metropolitan statistical area.

History 

In 1721, John Law and the Company of the Indies settled Germans along the Mississippi River, north of Ouachas Lake. The area of the Germans was called les Allemands (the Germans) or Karlstein. The German Coast was in present-day St. Charles & St. John the Baptist Parishes. Des Allemands means "of the Germans" in French.

The German Louisiana colony was originally up the Mississippi River at the Arkansas Post. But they experienced hostility from the Native Americans in that area, and moved to a location much closer to the colonial capital of New Orleans.

Geography
Des Allemands is located in southern St. Charles Parish and northeastern Lafourche Parish at  (29.825570, -90.469163). It is bordered to the north by the Paradis CDP and to the southeast by the Bayou Gauche CDP.

U.S. Route 90 crosses Bayou des Allemands at this point; the four-lane highway leads northeast  to New Orleans and west  to Morgan City. Bayou Des Allemands runs northwest  to Lac des Allemands and southeast  to Lake Salvador.

Demographics 

As of the 2020 United States census, there were 2,179 people, 670 households, and 468 families residing in the CDP.

Education
St. Charles Parish Public School System serves parts of Des Allemands east of Bayou Des Allemands. Allemands Elementary School in Des Allemands serves grades PK-2, while R.J. Vial Elementary School in Paradis serves grades 3–5; Vial opened in 1975. J. B. Martin Middle School in Paradis serves grades 6–8, and Hahnville High School in Boutte serves 9–12.

Residents of Des Allemands west of Bayou Des Allemands attend Lafourche Parish Public Schools. People in the Bayou Des Allemands area of Lafourche Parish are zoned to Raceland Lower Elementary School, Raceland Upper Elementary School, Raceland Middle School (all in Raceland), and Central Lafourche High School in Mathews.

Festivals
 Louisiana Catfish Festival on the third weekend in June
 Small parade in conjunction with Mardi Gras season

See also
German Coast

Live and Let Die: The motor boat chase scene in Roger Moore's debut James Bond movie was filmed in Bayou Des Allemands.

References

External links
 Allemands Elementary School

Census-designated places in Lafourche Parish, Louisiana
Census-designated places in Louisiana
Census-designated places in St. Charles Parish, Louisiana
German-American culture in Louisiana
German-American history
Census-designated places in Houma – Thibodaux metropolitan area
Census-designated places in New Orleans metropolitan area